Competitive analysis may refer to:

 Competitor analysis
 Competitive analysis (online algorithm)